Margaret Virginia "Bibi" Osterwald (February 3, 1920 – January 2, 2002) was an American actress.

Life and career
Osterwald was born in New Brunswick, New Jersey, the daughter of Dagmar (Kvastad) and Rudolf August Osterwald, a hotel owner.

As a student, Osterwald appeared in the Catholic University semi-pro revue in Washington, D.C., in August 1942. She gained acting experience in five years of work in summer stock theatre in Rockville, Maryland. She starred in Ten Nights in a Barroom at the Willard Hotel for 8 weeks starting in mid-August 1943. She then pursued a career on the New York stage. The Central Opera House [NYC], seating 2000, introduced Osterwald leading in Broken Hearts of Broadway in June 1944. "Miss Osterwald is on Broadway as one of the outstanding participants in 'Sing Out, Sweet Land.' What is more, next to stars Alfred Drake and Burl Ives, she has received the loudest praise of those critics who saw the play out of town. Its road tour Included Hartford, Boston and Philadelphia." -December 28, 1944.

Osterwald went on to appear in such Broadway shows as Gentlemen Prefer Blondes, Bus Stop, and The Golden Apple, for which she won an Outer Critics Circle Award in 1953.

Starting in the late 1940s, Osterwald began appearing on television, continuing to do so through the end of 2001. She was best known for her television role of Stella O'Brien, the cranky housekeeper for the Hathaway family on the soap opera, Where the Heart Is in the 1970s and also as Mrs. Sophie Steinberg, the mother of David Birney and mother-in-law of Meredith Baxter on the comedy series, Bridget Loves Bernie. In 1982, she originated the role of Nanny McTavish, Holly Sutton's long-time confidante, on General Hospital. Her other roles included Mrs. Nakamura on The Absent-Minded Professor (1988). She was also a regular on The S.S. Holiday (1950), The Imogene Coca Show (1954), Captain Billy's Showboat (1948) and Front Row Center (1949).

In the years just prior to her death in 2002, she was a voice actress for the cartoon series Rugrats. She also appeared in several films, including Parrish (1961), The World of Henry Orient (1964) (in which she had the role of Erica "Boothy" Booth), A Fine Madness (1966), Bank Shot (1974), Caddyshack II (1988) and As Good as It Gets (1997).

Outside of acting, she was a frequent participant on the Ben Bagley's Revisited series of famous pop composers including albums of rarities by Cole Porter, Rodgers & Hart Vol.2  and Frank Loesser.  Osterwald was a practicing Catholic and a registered Republican.

On January 2, 2002, Osterwald died of a lung ailment in Burbank, California, at age 81.

Filmography

References

External links

1920 births
2002 deaths
American television actresses
American stage actresses
American film actresses
American soap opera actresses
American voice actresses
Actresses from New Jersey
People from New Brunswick, New Jersey
20th-century American actresses
21st-century American actresses
New Jersey Republicans
California Republicans
American Roman Catholics